James Roy Paschal, Jr. (December 5, 1926 – July 5, 2004) was a Grand National and Winston Cup Series driver.

Career summary
Paschal won twenty-five races and twelve poles over his career. Elected to the "Stock Car Racing Hall of Fame" in 1977, he won the World 600 in 1964 and 1967 at Charlotte Speedway. He competed in the first 18 Southern 500s (1950–1967) and won 16 of 73 Grand American races (1969–1972). Paschal's 1967 win in the World 600 established a race record of 335 laps led, which would not be broken until 2016 when Martin Truex Jr. led 392 laps.

His strongest racing was found on short tracks where he would finish an average of 11th place. Paschal would find his weakness on road courses, where the sharp corners and the right turns would cause him to finish in an agonizing 27th place on average.

He has the most wins in the Cup series among drivers who are not in the NASCAR Hall of Fame and are eligible.

Retirement

After retiring from racing in 1972, Paschal owned and operated a trucking company and farmed both cattle and poultry.

Death
Paschal died on July 5, 2004, in Atlanta, Georgia following a battle with cancer.

He was buried near Jackson Creek, North Carolina.

Motorsports career results

NASCAR
(key) (Bold – Pole position awarded by qualifying time. Italics – Pole position earned by points standings or practice time. * – Most laps led. ** – All laps led.)

Grand National Series

Winston Cup Series

Daytona 500

Convertible Division

Grand National East Series

Pacific Coast Late Model Division

References

External links
 

1926 births
2004 deaths
Deaths from cancer in North Carolina
NASCAR drivers
Sportspeople from High Point, North Carolina
Racing drivers from North Carolina